Fish Above Sea Level is an independent 2011 drama film directed and written by Hazim Bitar. Leading Jordanian film critic Adnan Madanat called the film "The best Jordanian feature film."

Synopsis 
Fish Above Sea Level is about Talal (Rabee Zureikat) a young Ammani professional, who discovers upon his father's death that he is penniless. His late father, in an attempt to shore up his failing investments, mortgaged the family house. Talal has few days to save the family house in Amman from foreclosure. His only way out is to sell a farm house once owned by his late father in a village by the Dead Sea with a dark past. At the village he meets Dawoud (Abdallah Dghemaat) a young farmer who lives in the farm house. Before Talal can do anything with the farm house, Dawoud's approval is essential.

Main Film Festivals 
 African Diaspora Film Festival 2011
 Hollywood Black Film Festival 2011

External links 
 Variety: Fish Above Sea Level by  Ronnie Scheib 
 
 Fish Above Sea Level on Facebook
  البيطار: "سمك فوق سطح البحر" مبني على خلفية تاريخية لمنطقة الأغوار الجنوبية
 الغد :"سمك فوق سطح البحر": صور مدروسة وحوار يستند على خلفية تاريخية
 الدستور: عن فيلم سمك فوق سطح البحر  
 الخليج: فيلم أردني وملصق 
 الرأي: سمك فوق سطح البحر فيلم روائي أردني طويل للمخرج حازم البيطار
 

2011 films
2011 drama films
2010s Arabic-language films
Nonlinear narrative films
Jordanian drama films